Servando is a Spanish masculine given name. Notable people with the name include:

Servando Bayo (1822–1884), an Argentine politician
Servando Carrasco (born 1988), an American soccer player
Servando Gómez Martínez (born 1966), a Mexican drug trafficker
Servando González (1923–2008), a Mexican film director
Servando Teresa de Mier (1765–1827), a Mexican politician and priest
Servando Cabrera Moreno (1923–1981), a Cuban painter
Servando Ruiz-Gómez y González-Llanos (1821–1888), a Spanish politician
Servando Nicolás Villamil (born 1965), an Argentine footballer

Spanish masculine given names